Jorja Miller (born 8 February 2004) is a New Zealand rugby sevens player.

Rugby career 
Miller initially attended Timaru Girls' High School before moving to Christchurch Girls' High School in 2019. She plays for Canterbury in the Farah Palmer Cup.

In 2021, Miller was called to attend a High Performance Development Camp.

Miller signed a contract to join the Black Ferns Sevens squad in 2022. She missed out on selection for the 2022 Commonwealth Games in Birmingham due to a knee injury. She later made the Rugby World Cup Sevens squad that won a silver medal in Cape Town.

References 

2004 births
Living people
New Zealand female rugby union players
New Zealand female rugby sevens players
New Zealand women's international rugby sevens players